Associazione Calcio Milan had a poor season in 2000–01, finishing 6th in Serie A with 49 points, and only the scoring touch of Ukrainian striker Andriy Shevchenko  (24 goals in the league and 34 in all competitions) saved them from complete humiliation. 

In the Champions League, Milan started brightly, topping their group after some convincing performances, including a 0–2 win at the Camp Nou against Barcelona; however, they were eventually eliminated in the second group stage when they only managed a draw (while needing a win) in the group's last match against Spanish champions Deportivo La Coruña. With the 2001 Champions League final due to take place at the San Siro, the disappointment was immense, and resulted in the sacking of their 1998–99 title-winning coach Alberto Zaccheroni on 14 March 2001, one day after the draw with Deportivo, with Silvio Berlusconi appointing Milan legend Cesare Maldini as caretaker manager until the end of the season.

Cesare Maldini's brief caretaker tenure included a memorable 0–6 thumping of cross-city rivals Inter, and this victory would be the high point of the 2000–01 season for Milan.

Players

Transfers

Winter

Squad information

Left club during the season

Competitions

Serie A

League table

Results by round

Matches

Coppa Italia

Eightfinals

Quarterfinals

Semifinals

UEFA Champions League

Group stage

Second group stage

Statistics

Players statistics

Goalscorers
  Andriy Shevchenko 24
  Oliver Bierhoff 6
  Serginho 4
  Zvonimir Boban 3
  Massimo Ambrosini 3

References

A.C. Milan seasons
Milan